Kaylyn McKenzie Kyle (born October 6, 1988) is a former Canadian soccer player who last played as a midfielder for the Orlando Pride in the National Women's Soccer League. She was also a member of Canada women's national soccer team, winning a bronze medal at the 2012 Summer Olympics, and is a Right To Play ambassador. She currently serves as a soccer broadcaster.

Early life
Born and raised in Saskatoon, Saskatchewan, Kyle attended Bishop Mahoney High School, where she helped the soccer team win both the city and provincial titles. Her father, Doug, was a professional hockey player and her mother, Pat, a competitive volleyball player. Her older sister Courtnee also played soccer at the national level.

Kyle was named Saskatchewan Soccer Association Youth Female Player of The Year in 2004, 2005 and 2006, and Senior Female Player of the Year in 2010 and 2011.

University of Saskatchewan
Kyle attended the University of Saskatchewan in 2006. In 2006, she played Canadian Interuniversity Sport (CIS) soccer at the university, making 14 appearances and scoring three goals with three assists. After only a year with the team, she was invited to play for the Canada women's national soccer team and was offered a contract to play professionally in Sweden.

Playing career

Club

Vancouver Whitecaps
Kyle played a total of six seasons with the Vancouver Whitecaps from 2006 to 2012, not including 2009. During her inaugural W-League season in 2006, Kyle made one appearance for the Whitecaps for a total of 78 minutes. In 2007, she made eight appearances in her second season for the Whitecaps scoring one goal. During the 2008 season, Kyle made six appearances for the blue and white with two assists. In 2010, her fourth season with the Whitecaps, Kyle made five appearances tallying two assists. She had two playoff appearances for the team contributing one goal and one assist as the Whitecaps fell in the Championship final. In 2011, Kyle made three playoff appearances for the Whitecaps. She scored two goals during those appearances including the game-winning goal against arch-rival Seattle to help the team clinch third place.

Piteå IF
In 2009, Kyle played with the Piteå IF in Sweden's top-flight women's league, Damallsvenskan. She made 13 appearances for the team, scoring one goal.

Seattle Reign FC

On January 11, 2013, as part of the NWSL Player Allocation, Kyle joined the Seattle Reign FC in the National Women's Soccer League (NWSL). After playing a few games as a midfielder, Kyle shifted to a centre back position and helped strengthen a young defensive line. As a defender, Kyle was a leading scorer for the Reign scoring three goals on the season, all of them penalty kicks.  Kyle made 21 appearances for the squad, starting in nineteen matches and tallying 1,752 minutes played.

Boston Breakers
On September 10, 2013, Seattle traded her to the Boston Breakers for fellow Canadian Carmelina Moscato.

Houston Dash
On April 29, 2014, Kyle was traded to the Houston Dash for Nikki Washington.

Portland Thorns
Kyle played 12 games for Portland in 2015.

Orlando Pride
On October 26, 2015, Kyle was acquired by the Orlando Pride along with Alex Morgan from Portland Thorns FC. In return, Portland received Orlando's rights to their first expansion draft selection. She made 17 appearances for the Pride before being released prior to the start of the 2017 season.

International
Kyle has represented Canada on the U-17 and U-20 youth teams. She participated at the FIFA U-20 Women's World Cup twice in 2006 and 2008.

In 2008, she won her first cap for the senior team in a 4–0 loss to the United States. At the 2011 Pan American Games, she was a member of the gold-winning team that defeated Brazil.

Kyle won bronze at the London 2012 Olympic Games, playing a prominent role throughout the tournament in Canada's midfield. Canada defeated France 1–0 in the bronze medal game on August 9, 2012.

She won her 100th cap with the senior national team at the 2015 FIFA Women's World Cup, during the round of 16 match against Switzerland.

Kyle announced her retirement from international competition via social media on April 21, 2017.

Broadcasting career
Kyle became a broadcaster for TSN in 2017. She hit the headlines in June 2019 when she stated that Canada's rivals the US should not have celebrated whilst scoring the last few of their goals during the 13–0 defeat of Thailand during the Women's World Cup of that year. Kyle hosts for BeIN Sports regularly. She also serves as an analyst for broadcasts on the network. In 2020, she was announced to be the sideline reporter for Inter Miami CF.

Kyle joined the Apple TV MLS Season Pass broadcasting team for the 2023 season.

Personal life
She married Harrison Heath in 2017. They welcomed their first child in June 2018, Hayden Jack Heath.

See also
 List of Olympic medalists in football
 List of women's footballers with 100 or more international caps
 List of 2012 Summer Olympics medal winners
 List of FIFA Women's World Cup broadcasters
 List of current Major League Soccer broadcasters
 List of Canadian sports personalities
 List of 2011 Pan American Games medalists
 List of Vancouver Whitecaps Women players
 List of OL Reign players

References

External links

 
 
 Thorns bio
 

1988 births
Living people
Canadian people of Scottish descent
Soccer people from Saskatchewan
Canadian expatriate soccer players
Canadian women's soccer players
Canada women's international soccer players
Women's association football midfielders
Vancouver Whitecaps FC (women) players
Saskatchewan Huskies soccer players
Footballers at the 2011 Pan American Games
2011 FIFA Women's World Cup players
2015 FIFA Women's World Cup players
USL W-League (1995–2015) players
Footballers at the 2012 Summer Olympics
National Women's Soccer League players
Olympic soccer players of Canada
Olympic medalists in football
Olympic bronze medalists for Canada
OL Reign players
Piteå IF (women) players
Damallsvenskan players
Medalists at the 2012 Summer Olympics
Canadian expatriate sportspeople in Sweden
Sportspeople from Saskatoon
Houston Dash players
Boston Breakers players
Orlando Pride players
Pan American Games gold medalists for Canada
Canadian expatriate sportspeople in the United States
Expatriate women's soccer players in the United States
FIFA Century Club
Pan American Games medalists in football
Portland Thorns FC players
Canadian sports announcers
Medalists at the 2011 Pan American Games